"The Magic Roundabout" in Hemel Hempstead, Hertfordshire, England, is the familiar name given to the Plough Roundabout. The familiar name comes from the children's television programme, and is also used for a similar junction in Swindon and the M40 junction in Denham. The official name relates to a former public house, called The Plough Inn, which was between the junction of what is now Selden Hill and St Albans Road. It has also been known as the Moor End Roundabout as it is adjacent to the part of Boxmoor nearest the town. Before Hemel Hempstead became a new town the roads met in a simple junction which was then replaced by a standard roundabout.

Description 

Constructed in 1973, the "Magic Roundabout" in Hemel Hempstead was voted the UK's second-worst roundabout in a 2005 poll held by an insurance company (the winner being its Swindon counterpart).

In 2011 the roundabout was voted the best in Britain by motorists in a competition organised by a car leasing service.

The roundabout is unusual in that traffic flows both clockwise (the standard flow direction of British roundabouts) and anticlockwise. Drivers approaching the roundabout from any junction can choose to turn left or right, and they are free to make U-turns using any of the mini roundabouts at the junction. Effectively, the junction should be treated as six individual roundabouts - right of way must be given on the approach of each new mini roundabout.

Early history 

The original magic roundabout had six exits in total, with the BP building spanning "Marlowes", the road leading to the town centre, in the approximate position of the earlier railway viaduct. The BP building was found to be unstable due to defective reinforced concrete and the exit had to be closed. The building was demolished but the original route was not restored, although a newer side exit from the roundabout replaced the junction with Marlowes off a side road.

See also

Other similar roundabouts 
 Magic Roundabout (Colchester)
 Magic Roundabout (High Wycombe)
 Magic Roundabout (Swindon)
 Denham Roundabout, Denham, Buckinghamshire at Junction 1 of the M40 and the meeting of the A40, A412 and A4020 roads.
 Hatton Cross, at the southeast corner of Heathrow Airport, just outside Hatton Cross Underground station. This is especially challenging due to the large number of delivery drivers under pressure to meet airport deadlines mixing with drivers dropping off passengers who are unfamiliar with the roads around Heathrow.
 Sadler's Farm Roundabout, a Magic Roundabout near Southend-on-Sea, Essex.

References

External links 

 History of the roundabout at the Hemeltoday website
 BBC discussion forum on the Plough roundabout
 Google Maps satellite image view

H
Road junctions in England
Transport in Hertfordshire
Hemel Hempstead